Yohan Hautcœur (born 30 October 1981) is a retired French footballer who played as a midfielder.

Having played for Le Mans, Lorient and Saint-Étienne in Ligue 1, he has also represented Châteauroux and Amiens.

References

External links
 Profile at L'Équipe

1981 births
Living people
French footballers
Association football midfielders
Le Mans FC players
AS Saint-Étienne players
FC Lorient players
LB Châteauroux players
Amiens SC players
Ligue 1 players
Ligue 2 players